

This is a list of the National Register of Historic Places listings in Springfield, Massachusetts.

This is intended to be a complete list of the properties and districts on the National Register of Historic Places in Springfield, Massachusetts, United States. Latitude and longitude coordinates are provided for many National Register properties and districts; these locations may be seen together in an online map.

There are 90 properties and districts listed on the National Register in the city, including 1 National Historic Landmark.

Current listings

|}

See also

 List of National Historic Landmarks in Massachusetts
 National Register of Historic Places listings in Hampden County, Massachusetts

References

 
Springfield, Massachusetts-related lists
Springfield

Springfield, Massachusetts